San Vito de Java  Airport  is an airport serving the town of San Vito in Puntarenas Province, Costa Rica.

There is a wide ravine just short of Runway 08, and rising terrain in all quadrants.

See also

 Transport in Costa Rica
 List of airports in Costa Rica

References

External links
 OurAirports - San Vito
 OpenStreetMap - San Vito
 HERE/Nokia Maps - San Vito
 FallingRain - San Vito de Java

Airports in Costa Rica
Puntarenas Province